Guadalupe is a city and surrounding municipality located in the state of Nuevo León, in northern Mexico. It is part of the Greater Monterrey Metropolitan area.

The municipality of Guadalupe, which lies adjacent to the east side of Monterrey, also borders the municipalities of San Nicolás de los Garza, Apodaca, Pesquería, and Juárez.

at an altitude of 500 meters above sea level. As of the 2005 census its official population was 691,434 in the city and 691,931 in the entire municipality. It is the second-largest city and municipality in the state. The municipality has an area of  (58.42 sq mi).

The city was founded on January 4, 1716, but the land was inhabited long before that.  When Monterrey was founded in 1596, the land, which was populated by various indigenous tribes, was ceded to Diego de Montemayor, the founder of Monterrey, but he did not make use of the land.  In 1627, the land was turned into large plantations, where sugar cane and corn was raised.  The owner of the land during around the time of the turn of the 18th century was named Capitán Nicolás Ochoa de Elejalde, but the land was taken from him by the Spanish government and converted into a mission in February, 1715.  In 1756, the city was renamed the "Pueblo de la Nueva Tlaxcala de Nuestra Señora de Guadalupe de Horcasitas".  On March 5, 1825, the city was declared a municipality of Nuevo León and categorized as a villa, even though for many years it continued to be called the "Villa de Guadalupe".

Tourist attractions 

 Cerro de la Silla: Although it is the icon of the city of Monterrey, it is located in the municipality of Guadalupe and is the preferred place for athletes to climb it and it is also a family walk.

 

The logo for the BBVA Stadium, the home of Club de Futbol Monterrey. 

 La Pastora Park: Inside the park, there is a zoo that houses different species of animals, in addition to an aviary and a herbarium.

 Pipo Park: Park dedicated to the "Pipo" region clown, has walkers along the river and various green areas.

 BBVA Stadium: Opened in 2015 with a seating capacity of 53,500 spectators, Liga MX soccer team Monterrey's home games are played here. The venue has also hosted several concerts since its opening. 

 Guadalupe Expo: The Regional Livestock Exhibition is held annually, which in addition to the sample of cattle and sheep, there are mechanical games, restaurants of Mexican snacks and regional dishes and El Domo Care which is where great artists perform.

 Magic Forest: A few meters from the park the shepherdess is this tourist attraction with entertainment for the whole family, some of its attractions are the zombie ride, mice against police, the king loop fighter, ski flyer, etc.

 Tolteca Park: It has the permanent water of the La Silla River, a place for family recreation, it has: boats, slides and soda fountains, grills and snacks.

  Guadalupe City Museum: Dedicated to the approach to the origins of the municipality through its history, geographical features and original settlers.

Gender Violence Alert 

Due to the high incidence of feminicide violence in this municipality, the Gender Violence Alert Against Women was declared on November 18, 2016 .

Employer party  

The patron feast is the second Sunday of the month of August, the patron of the town is the Lord of the Expiration that is in the Ancient Temple of the same name. He is also called the lord of the rain; For the celebration there are various activities accompanied by music and dance, all this in the main square of the municipality, the mornings are sung at about 10:00 pm, and then continue with the pyrotechnics.

Legend:
... It happened in one morning, when the first light of dawn was barely visible. The Indians woke up startled and rushed to the Chapel, because they heard the bell ringing. And his shock was even greater, when he realized that it was not the Indian Sacristan who sounded it, but an ass that moved his neck and pulled the rope with his snout.
Heavy load brought the beast on its backs. - some merchant will have lost it - they said, but in vain they looked in the way; They didn't even find a recent trace of any trace on the path.
Although with the ensuing fear, they freed the borrico from such weight; and when they laid down the drawer lake of rough and badly interlocked boards, they noticed that its content was a picture of the crucified and life-sized Lord. Bowing down with fennel before such a providential visit; some cried, moved by the expression of the face of the Lord; others crossed themselves with a gesture of amazement and joy.
They introduced the Christ into the Chapel, replacing with him the great wooden cross that stood out at the bottom, and which had been venerated until then as the holder of the primitive estate.
So overwhelming was the jubilation, that no one knew more about the tired jumento they had left by the door. They looked for them a lot among the bushes and fields; everything was useless, they didn't find it; nevertheless it is said that they found him dead tired near the north door of the Chapel and that he was buried there.

Since then, this image is venerated in what is now the Parish and Shrine of Our Lady of Guadalupe.

Sister Cities
Guadalupe has 3 sister cities.:
  - McAllen, Texas, USA
  - Reno, Nevada, USA
  - Laredo, Texas, USA

References

Sources
Link to tables of population data from Census of 2005 INEGI: Instituto Nacional de Estadística, Geografía e Informática
Nuevo León Enciclopedia de los Municipios de México

External links
 Ciudad Guadalupe Official website

Populated places in Nuevo León
Monterrey metropolitan area
Populated places established in 1716